Robert Gleason may refer to:

 Robert Gleason (politician) (fl. 1950s–2020s), American businessman who chaired the Pennsylvania Republican Party
 Robert Gleason (murderer) (1970–2013), American serial killer

See also
 Robert Gleeson (1873–1919), South African cricketer
 Roberto Albores Gleason (born 1979), Mexican politician